Most historians of Brittany are French historians, apart from Michael Jones.

 Bertrand d'Argentré
 Pierre Daru
 Michel Denis
 Léon Fleuriot
 Gildas
 Kristian Hamon
 Michael Jones
 Arthur de La Borderie
 Pierre Le Baud
 Gwennole Le Menn
 Dom Lobineau
 Nennius

 
Lists of people by occupation and nationality